The 1936 United States presidential election in New Hampshire was held on November 3, 1936 as part of the 1936 United States presidential election. The state voters chose four electors to the Electoral College, who voted for president and vice president.

New Hampshire voted for Democratic Party candidate and incumbent President Franklin D. Roosevelt, who won the state by a narrow margin of 1.75%, after early reports showed Landon carrying the state. With Roosevelt's victory in New Hampshire, he became the first Democratic candidate since President Woodrow Wilson in 1916 to carry the state. The state was also the closest in the election.

While Landon lost the state, the 47.98% of the popular vote made New Hampshire his third strongest state after neighboring Vermont and Maine, which were the only two states Landon won in the election.

Results

Results by county

See also
 United States presidential elections in New Hampshire

References

New Hampshire
1936
1936 New Hampshire elections